The Acrobatic Gymnastics World Championships are the World Championships for acrobatic gymnastics. Before 2006 they were known as the World Sports Acrobatics Championships.

Editions

Junior and Age Group 
Championships:

1989 to 1999 : Junior

2001 to 2002 : World Age Group Games

2004 to 2006 : International Age Group Competition

2008 to Now: World Age Group Competition

All-time medal table

See also 
 Acrobatic Gymnastics European Championships

References

Results 
http://www.sportsacrobatics.info/archive.htm

 
Acrobatic gymnastics competitions
Recurring sporting events established in 1974